Temnine Et Tahta is a village located in the Baalbek District of the Baalbek-Hermel Governorate in Lebanon.

History
In 1838, Eli Smith noted Temnin the lower's population as being predominantly  Metawileh.

References

Bibliography

External links
Temnine Et Tahta, localiban

Populated places in Baalbek District
Shia Muslim communities in Lebanon